Rupamati is a 1934 Nepali novel by Rudra Raj Pande. It was the first widely–read novel in Nepali language. It was published in 1934 (1991 BS) and is the debut novel of the author. Even though Pande wrote 6 novels after Rupamati, it remained his most popular work. Many prominent writers such as Laxmi Prasad Devkota, Lekhnath Paudyal, Balkrishna Sama and Baburam Acharya praised the novel for its contribution to Nepali literature.

Synopsis 
When Pandit Chhabilal's son Habilal was nine years old, he married six-year-old Rupamati, the only daughter of Mohan Prasad Luitel. He is benevolent. Her mother-in-law Ugra Chand Chotha is miserable and temperamental and tortures Rupamati. Having learned patience and endurance from her mother, Rupamati quietly endures her mother-in-law's circus behavior in tears. The novel presented a portrait of an ideal Nepali woman.

Translations 
The novel has been translated into multiple languages. The novel was translated into English by Shanti Mishra in 1999. It was translated into Urdu language by Prof. Dr. Tahira Nighat Nayyar.

See also 

 Bir Charitra
 Mann 
 Champa

References 

20th-century Nepalese novels
1934 Nepalese novels
Nepalese novels
Nepali-language novels
Novels set in Nepal